Petar Gargov (born 11 April 1983) is a former Bulgarian footballer and manager.

Career

In his playing days, Gargov represented Bourgas-based Chernomorets, Neftochimic and Master as well as OFC Pomorie. Gargov was formerly part of the Bulgaria U21 national team, receiving his first call-up in 2005. Following his retirement, he worked as a goalkeeping coach at Master.

References

1983 births
Living people
Bulgarian footballers
Association football goalkeepers
FC Chernomorets Burgas players
Neftochimic Burgas players
FC Pomorie players
First Professional Football League (Bulgaria) players